The Bentonville Anti-Horse Thief Society was founded in Bentonville, Ohio in March 1853.  The society was created to stop horse thievery, since horses were essential to transportation and farming in the 19th century.  

The society has been operational for over 150 years, allowing anyone to join.  Previously, the cost of membership and dues went to the recovery of horses and hanging of the thief.  The thieves were hung without trials.

While horse thievery is no longer a problem, the society still operates.  It holds meetings with the function shifted from a citizens enforcement group to a social club.  

There are thousands of members across America, as well as many international members.  Lifetime membership is granted for a donation of $1.  

The society holds an annual banquet on the last Saturday of April.

See also
The Society in Dedham for Apprehending Horse Thieves 
Red Hook Society for the Apprehension and Detention of Horse Thieves

References
 http://www.ohiohistorycentral.org/entry.php?rec=2943
 http://www.lrgaf.org/articles/ahta.htm

History of Ohio
Law enforcement in Ohio
Anti-horse theft societies